Spartaco Fontanot (born 17 January 1922 at Monfalcone, Italy, and died 21 February 1944, at Fort Mont-Valérien, France) was one of the members of the French resistance shot at Mont Valérien as a member of the Manouchian group. He was an Italian volunteer soldier in the French liberation army FTP-MOI. His name is one of the ten featured on the "affiche rouge", the propaganda poster displayed by the Germans during the trial of the 23 members of the Manouchian group. His photograph is also on the poster, with the caption "Fontanot, Italian communist, 12 attacks".

Early years 
Spartaco Fontanot was born on 17 January in Monfalcone, in the province of Gorizia in Friuli-Venezia Giulia, Italy. He arrived in France at the age of two, his antifascist parents having been obliged to leave Italy when Benito Mussolini came to power.

After elementary school, he took classes at the technical college of Puteaux, which he left with a "certificate of professional aptitude" as a fitter, turner, and draftsman. His wish was to become an engineer, but his parents were not able to help him pursue his studies, and he started at a small factory as a turner. He still harbored the ambition to become an engineer by taking night classes at the École des Arts et Métiers in Paris.

Second world war 
At the time of the German occupation in 1941, Fontano quickly devoted himself to the armed struggle, and, in 1942, he volunteered for the FTP's immigrant section in the Paris region, a part of the French forces of the interior (FFI). Unable to divide his efforts, he stopped taking night courses.

In March 1943, the police came to arrest his father and sister. A wanted man, he was forced to quit his parental home.

He took part in numerous attacks and sabotages against the occupying forces and against German officers, notably at Rueil, Place de la Concorde, and even bus stations. Of note are the assassination operations he undertook against :fr:Julius Ritter, and against General von Schaumburg, the commandant of greater Paris. He also sabotaged many electricity pylons and was rated as an excellent shot. Because of his command experience as the head of an operational detachment under the command of Missak Manouchian, he was appointed lieutenant in the French Forces of the Interior, the FFI (Forces Françaises de l'Intérieur).

Arrested in Paris by the police on 13 November 1943, Fontano did not give them any information. He was transferred to Fresnes prison and sentenced by the military court; his execution took place on 21 February 1944 at Mont Valérien along with 21 of his comrades.

Spartaco Fontanot was one of three heroes in his family; Jacques Fontanot (18 years old) and Nérone Fontanot also gave their lives for the liberation of France.

See also 
 Main-d'œuvre immigrée
 Francs-tireurs et partisans - Main-d'œuvre immigrée
 Affiche rouge
 Brigades Spéciales
 Geheime Feld Polizei

Bibliography 
 FFI - FTPF, Pages de gloire des vingt-trois, Immigration, 1951.

External links
    La journée d'un "Terroriste"
   Discours d'André SANTINI et Henry KARAYAN

1917 births
1944 deaths
French people of Italian descent
Italian anti-fascists
FTP-MOI
Communist members of the French Resistance
Executed Italian people
Resistance members killed by Nazi Germany
People from Monfalcone
People executed by Germany by firearm
French people executed by Nazi Germany
Italian people executed by Nazi Germany
Deaths by firearm in France
Affiche Rouge